Agriotypus is a genus of insect belonging to the family Ichneumonidae first described by John Curtis in 1832.

Species 
 Agriotypus armatus Curtis, 1832
 Agriotypus changbaishanus Chao, 1981
 Agriotypus chaoi Bennett, 2001
 Agriotypus dui Tang, He & Chen, 2022
 Agriotypus gracilis Waterston, 1930
 Agriotypus himalensis Mason, 1971
 Agriotypus jilinensis Chao, 1981
 Agriotypus kambaitensis Gupta & Chandra, 1975
 Agriotypus lui Chao, 1986
 Agriotypus maae Tang, He & Chen, 2022
 Agriotypus maculiceps Chao, 1992
 Agriotypus masneri Bennett, 2001
 Agriotypus morsei Tang, He & Chen, 2022
 Agriotypus silvestris Konishi & Aoyagi, 1994
 Agriotypus succinctus (Chao, 1992)
 Agriotypus taishunensis Tang, He & Chen, 2022
 Agriotypus tangi Chao, 1992
 Agriotypus townesi Chiu, 1986
 Agriotypus yangae Tang, He & Chen, 2022
 Agriotypus zhejiangensis He & Chen, 1997
 Agriotypus zhengi He & Chen, 1991

References

Ichneumonidae